There is a small community of , mainly comprising expatriates from Japan. As of 2016, there were about 1,107 Japanese nationals in Nepal.

Overview
Many Japanese people live or work in the Thamel neighborhood of Kathmandu. The district hosts a Japanese street festival, showcasing Japanese cultural activities, food, and products, organized by Japanese local groups including the Japanese Thamel Association and JICA.

Many recent Japanese arrivals in Nepal are members of medical teams sent to provide surgeries for low-paid Nepalese communities. Most of the costs for medical equipment, supplies and medicines delivered by these teams were covered by charity contributions from Japanese people and companies.

Education
The Kathmandu Japanese Supplementary School is a supplementary programme for Japanese children in Kathmandu.

Notable people
 Takashi Miyahara (宮原巍) - Nepalese tourism entrepreneur and politician
 Noboru Iwamura (岩村昇) - Japanese Biologist
 Ekai Kawaguchi (河口慧海) - Japanese Buddhist monk
 Tow Ubukata (冲方 丁) - Japanese writer

See also
 Japan-Nepal relations
 Nepalis in Japan

References

Nepal
Japanese diaspora in Asia
Ethnic groups in Nepal